Turzi is a French electronic group, formed by Romain Turzi in Versailles. Their track "Afghanistan" appeared on the 2nd Amorphous Androgynous compilation alongside other acts such as Oasis and Faust.
Their 2nd album 'B' featured guest vocals from Primal Scream's Bobby Gillespie on the track "Baltimore".
"Baltimore" was featured in 2 episodes of CSI: Miami (904, 911).

Discography

Studio albums

Extended plays

Solo project

Remixes

Live soundtracks

Soundtracks

Notes, Sources and References 

Pitchfork Media review of 'A'
http://pitchfork.com/reviews/albums/10622-a/

Popmatters review of 'B'
http://www.popmatters.com/pm/review/125958-turzi-b/

External links 
 Turzi on Myspace

French electronic music groups
Musical groups from Île-de-France